The Mohave Valley Daily News is a newspaper in Bullhead City, Arizona, United States. It was started in 1964 by Lee B. Perry, then owner and publisher of the nearby Needles Desert Star, a weekly newspaper serving Needles, California and the southern Mohave Valley. It is owned by Brehm Communications, and it has a circulation of 8,600.

Other publications 
News West Publishing, the division of Brehm that publishes the Daily News, also publishes:
 The Bullhead City Booster (weekly)
 Laughlin Entertainer (weekly)
 The Laughlin Times, serving Laughlin, Nevada (weekly)
 Real Estate 411 (monthly)
 Needles Desert Star, published in Needles, California (weekly)

A separate division of News West Publishing publishes The Wickenburg Sun in Wickenburg, Arizona.

References

External links 
 

Newspapers published in Arizona